Radisson Blu is an international chain of hotels operated by Radisson Hotels. With roots dating back to the 1960s, the Radisson Blu brand name came into existence in 2009 with a rebranding from Radisson SAS. Its hotels are found in major cities, key airport gateways and leisure destinations.

History

Early history, SAS Royal Hotel

Radisson Blu has roots dating back to the opening of the SAS Royal Hotel in Denmark in 1960. Designed by Arne Jacobsen for SAS Group, it was the world's first designer hotel. The hotel was initially under the catering division of the group but merged with the hospitality division to become SAS Catering and Hotels. In 1982, the hotels were spun off as a separate division, operating under the name SAS International Hotels. and became known as SAS International Hotels in 1985.

In 1994, Radisson SAS was created as a partnership with Radisson and SAS International Hotels for operations in Europe, the Middle East and Africa. By the year 2000, the brand was operating 100 hotels.

2009 to present; Rebrand as Radisson Blu

The Radisson Blu brand first came into being in 2009 when Radisson SAS rebranded and changed its name to Radisson Blu. The name ‘Blu’ was chosen as part of a research project to find a new visual identity as the company looked to replace the familiar SAS blue box.

Radisson Blu entered the United States market with the opening of its first hotel in Chicago, Illinois in 2011. The hotel occupies part of the Aqua skyscraper developed by Studio Gang Architects. In 2013, it opened its second location. It is connected to the Mall of America in Bloomington, Minnesota. In 2010, Radisson Blu was named the largest upper upscale hotel chain in Europe.

Concept

Radisson Blu hotels are mainly located in major cities, key airport gateways and leisure destinations. It is described as an "upper upscale" hotel brand.

See also
2015 Bamako hotel attack
AquaDom

References

 
SAS Group
Radisson Hotel Group brands
Rezidor Hotel Group
Hotels established in 1960